Los Alamos National Laboratory (often shortened as Los Alamos and LANL) is one of the sixteen research and development laboratories of the United States Department of Energy (DOE), located a short distance northwest of Santa Fe, New Mexico, in the American southwest. Best known for its central role in helping develop the first atomic bomb, LANL is one of the world's largest and most advanced scientific institutions.

Los Alamos was established in 1943 as Project Y, a top-secret site for designing nuclear weapons under the Manhattan Project during World War II. Chosen for its remote yet relatively accessible location, it served as the main hub for conducting and coordinating nuclear research, bringing together some of the world's most famous scientists, among them numerous Nobel Prize winners. The town of Los Alamos, directly north of the lab, grew extensively through this period. 

After the war ended in 1945, Project Y's existence was made public, and it became known universally as Los Alamos. In 1952, the Atomic Energy Commission formed a second design lab under the direction of the University of California, Berkeley, which became the Lawrence Livermore National Laboratory (LLNL). The two labs competed on a wide variety of bomb designs, but with the end of the Cold War, have focused increasingly on civilian missions. Today, Los Alamos conducts multidisciplinary research in fields such as national security, space exploration, nuclear fusion, renewable energy, medicine, nanotechnology, and supercomputing.   

While owned by the federal government, LANL is privately managed and operated by Triad National Security, LLC.

History

The Manhattan Project

The laboratory was founded during World War II as a secret, centralized facility to coordinate the scientific research of the Manhattan Project, the Allied project to develop the first nuclear weapons. In September 1942, the difficulties encountered in conducting preliminary studies on nuclear weapons at universities scattered across the country indicated the need for a laboratory dedicated solely to that purpose.

General Leslie Groves wanted a central laboratory at an isolated location for safety, and to keep the scientists away from the populace. It should be at least 200 miles from international boundaries and west of the Mississippi. Major John Dudley suggested Oak City, Utah, or Jemez Springs, New Mexico, but both were rejected. Jemez Springs was only a short distance from the current site. Project Y director J. Robert Oppenheimer had spent much time in his youth in the New Mexico area, and suggested the Los Alamos Ranch School on the mesa. Dudley had rejected the school as not meeting Groves’ criteria, but as soon as Groves saw it he said in effect "This is the place". Oppenheimer became the laboratory's first director.

During the Manhattan Project, Los Alamos hosted thousands of employees, including many Nobel Prize-winning scientists. The location was a total secret. Its only mailing address was a post office box, number 1663, in Santa Fe, New Mexico. Eventually two other post office boxes were used, 180 and 1539, also in Santa Fe. Though its contract with the University of California was initially intended to be temporary, the relationship was maintained long after the war. Until the atomic bombings of Hiroshima and Nagasaki, Japan, University of California president Robert Sproul did not know what the purpose of the laboratory was and thought it might be producing a "death ray". The only member of the UC administration who knew its true purpose—indeed, the only one who knew its exact physical location—was the Secretary-Treasurer Robert Underhill, who was in charge of wartime contracts and liabilities.

The work of the laboratory culminated in several atomic devices, one of which was used in the first nuclear test near Alamogordo, New Mexico, codenamed "Trinity", on July 16, 1945. The other two were weapons, "Little Boy" and "Fat Man", which were used in the attacks on Hiroshima and Nagasaki. The Laboratory received the Army-Navy ‘E’ Award for Excellence in production on October 16, 1945.

Post-war
After the war, Oppenheimer retired from the directorship, and it was taken over by Norris Bradbury, whose initial mission was to make the previously hand-assembled atomic bombs "G.I. proof" so that they could be mass-produced and used without the assistance of highly trained scientists. Many of the original Los Alamos "luminaries" chose to leave the laboratory, and some even became outspoken opponents to the further development of nuclear weapons.

The name officially changed to the Los Alamos Scientific Laboratory (LASL) on January 1, 1947. By this time, Argonne had already been made the first National Laboratory the previous year. Los Alamos would not become a National Laboratory in name until 1981.

In the years since the 1940s, Los Alamos was responsible for the development of the hydrogen bomb, and many other variants of nuclear weapons. In 1952, Lawrence Livermore National Laboratory was founded to act as Los Alamos' "competitor", with the hope that two laboratories for the design of nuclear weapons would spur innovation. Los Alamos and Livermore served as the primary classified laboratories in the U.S. national laboratory system, designing all the country's nuclear arsenal. Additional work included basic scientific research, particle accelerator development, health physics, and fusion power research as part of Project Sherwood. Many nuclear tests were undertaken in the Marshall Islands and at the Nevada Test Site. During the late-1950s, a number of scientists including Dr. J. Robert "Bob" Beyster left Los Alamos to work for General Atomics (GA) in San Diego.

Three major nuclear-related accidents have occurred at LANL. Criticality accidents occurred in August 1945 and May 1946, and a third accident occurred during an annual physical inventory in December 1958.

Several buildings associated with the Manhattan Project at Los Alamos were declared a National Historic Landmark in 1965.

Post-Cold War
At the end of the Cold War, both labs went through a process of intense scientific diversification in their research programs to adapt to the changing political conditions that no longer required as much research towards developing new nuclear weapons and has led the lab to increase research for "non-war" science and technology. Los Alamos' nuclear work is currently thought to relate primarily to computer simulations and stockpile stewardship. The development of the Dual-Axis Radiographic Hydrodynamic Test Facility will allow complex simulations of nuclear tests to take place without full explosive yields.

The laboratory contributed to the early development of the flow cytometry technology. In the 1950s, researcher Mack Fulwyler developed a technique for sorting erythrocytes that combined the Coulter Principle of Coulter counter technologies, which measures the presence of cells and their size, with ink jet technology, which produces a laminar flow of liquid that breaks up into separate, fine drops. In 1969, Los Alamos reported the first fluorescence detector apparatus, which accurately measured the number and size of ovarian cells and blood cells.

As of 2017, other research performed at the lab included developing cheaper, cleaner bio-fuels and advancing scientific understanding around renewable energy.

Non-nuclear national security and defense development is also a priority at the lab. This includes preventing outbreaks of deadly diseases by improving detection tools and the monitoring the effectiveness of the United States’ vaccine distribution infrastructure. Additional advancements include the ASPECT airplane that can detect bio threats from the sky.

Medical work
In 2008, development for a safer, more comfortable and accurate test for breast cancer was ongoing by scientists Lianjie Huang and Kenneth M. Hanson and collaborators. The new technique, called ultrasound-computed tomography (ultrasound CT), uses sound waves to accurately detect small tumors that traditional mammography cannot.

The lab has made intense efforts for humanitarian causes through its scientific research in medicine. In 2010, three vaccines for the Human Immunodeficiency Virus were being tested by lab scientist Bette Korber and her team. "These vaccines might finally deal a lethal blow to the AIDS virus", says Chang-Shung Tung, leader of the Lab's Theoretical Biology and Biophysics group.

Negative publicity
The laboratory has attracted negative publicity from a number of events.  In 1999, Los Alamos scientist Wen Ho Lee was accused of 59 counts of mishandling classified information by downloading nuclear secrets—"weapons codes" used for computer simulations of nuclear weapons tests—to data tapes and removing them from the lab. After ten months in jail, Lee pleaded guilty to a single count and the other 58 were dismissed with an apology from U.S. District Judge James Parker for his incarceration. Lee had been suspected for having shared U.S. nuclear secrets with China, but investigators were never able to establish what Lee did with the downloaded data. In 2000, two computer hard drives containing classified data were announced to have gone missing from a secure area within the laboratory, but were later found behind a photocopier.

Science mission 
Los Alamos National Laboratory's mission is to "solve national security challenges through simultaneous excellence". The laboratory's strategic plan reflects U.S. priorities spanning nuclear security, intelligence, defense, emergency response, nonproliferation, counterterrorism, energy security, emerging threats, and environmental management. This strategy is aligned with priorities set by the Department of Energy (DOE), the National Nuclear Security Administration (NNSA), and national strategy guidance documents, such as the Nuclear Posture Review, the National Security Strategy, and the Blueprint for a Secure Energy Future

Los Alamos is the senior laboratory in the DOE system, and executes work in all areas of the DOE mission: national security, science, energy, and environmental management. The laboratory also performs work for the Department of Defense (DoD), Intelligence Community (IC), and Department of Homeland Security (DHS), among others.
The laboratory's multidisciplinary scientific capabilities and activities are organized into six Capability Pillars:
 Information, Science and Technology (IS&T)
 Materials for the Future seeks to optimize materials for national security applications by predicting and controlling their performance and functionality through discovery science and engineering.
 Nuclear and Particle Futures integrates nuclear experiments, theory, and simulation to understand and engineer complex nuclear phenomena.
 Science of Signatures (SoS) applies science and technology to intransigent problems of system identification and characterization in areas of global security, nuclear defense, energy, and health.
 Complex Natural and Engineered Systems (CNES)
 Weapons Systems (WS)

Los Alamos operates three main user facilities:
 The Center for Integrated Nanotechnologies: The Center for Integrated Nanotechnologies is a DOE/Office of Science National User Facility operated jointly by Sandia and Los Alamos National Laboratories with facilities at both Laboratories. CINT is dedicated to establishing the scientific principles that govern the design, performance, and integration of nanoscale materials into microscale and macroscale systems and devices.
 Los Alamos Neutron Science Center (LANSCE): The Los Alamos Neutron Science Center is one of the world's most powerful linear accelerators. LANSCE provides the scientific community with intense sources of neutrons with the capability of performing experiments supporting civilian and national security research. This facility is sponsored by the Department of Energy, the National Nuclear Security Administration, Office of Science and Office of Nuclear Energy, Science and Technology.
 The National High Magnetic Field Laboratory (NHMFL), Pulsed Field Facility: The Pulsed Field Facility at Los Alamos National Laboratory in Los Alamos, New Mexico, is one of three campuses of the National High Magnetic Field Laboratory (NHMFL), the other two being at Florida State University, Tallahassee and the University of Florida. The Pulsed Field Facility at Los Alamos National Laboratory operates an international user program for research in high magnetic fields.
As of 2017, the Los Alamos National Laboratory is using data and algorithms to possibly protect public health by tracking the growth of infectious diseases. Digital epidemiologists at the lab's Information Systems and Modeling group are using clinical surveillance data, Google search queries, census data, Wikipedia, and even tweets to create a system that could predict epidemics. The team is using data from Brazil as its model; Brazil was notably threatened by the Zika virus as it prepared to host the Summer Olympics in 2016.

Laboratory management and operations
Around LANL's 43-square-mile property are 2,000 dumpsites which have permanently contaminated the environment. It also contributed to thousands of dumpsites at 108 locations in 29 US states.

Contract changes
Continuing efforts to make the laboratory more efficient led the Department of Energy to open its contract with the University of California to bids from other vendors in 2003. Though the university and the laboratory had difficult relations many times since their first World War II contract, this was the first time that the university ever had to compete for management of the laboratory. The University of California decided to create a private company with the Bechtel Corporation, Washington Group International, and the BWX Technologies to bid on the contract to operate the laboratory. The UC/Bechtel led corporation—Los Alamos National Security, LLC (LANS)—was pitted against a team formed by the University of Texas System partnered with Lockheed-Martin. In December 2005, the Department of Energy announced that LANS had won the next seven-year contract to manage and operate the laboratory.

On June 1, 2006, the University of California ended its sixty years of direct involvement in operating Los Alamos National Laboratory, and management control of the laboratory was taken over by Los Alamos National Security, LLC with effect October 1, 2007. Approximately 95% of the former 10,000 plus UC employees at LANL were rehired by LANS to continue working at LANL. Other than UC appointing three members to the eleven member board of directors that oversees LANS, UC now has virtually no responsibility or direct involvement in LANL. UC policies and regulations that apply to UC campuses and its two national laboratories in California (Lawrence Berkeley and Lawrence Livermore) no longer apply to LANL, and the LANL director no longer reports to the UC Regents or UC Office of the President. Also, LANL employees were removed from the UC's 403(b) retirement savings and defined benefits pension program and placed in a LANS run program. While the LANS retirement program provides rehired UC employees with pensions similar to those UC would have given them, LANS no longer guarantees full pensions to newly hired LANL employees. It now provides basic 401(k) retirement saving options.

On June 8, 2018, the NNSA announced that Triad National Security, LLC, a joint venture between Battelle Memorial Institute, the University of California, and Texas A&M University, would assume operation and management of LANL beginning November 1, 2018.

Safety management

In August 2011, a near criticality incident happened with eight rods of plutonium placed close to each other to take a photo. In the aftermath, 12 of 14 of the lab's safety staff left in anger about their advice being dismissed by the management. Without safety management, the Plutonium Facility PF-4 was shut down in 2013 and is still closed in 2017 because the lab fails to meet expectations. As a consequence, the U.S. Department of Energy, sought alternative suppliers the LANL's management contract.

The lab was penalized with a $57 million reduction in its 2014 budget over the February 14, 2014 accident at the Waste Isolation Pilot Plant for which it was partly responsible.

In August 2017, the improper storage of plutonium metal could have triggered a criticality accident, and subsequently staff failed to declare the failure as required by procedure.

Extended operations

With support of the National Science Foundation, LANL operates one of the three National High Magnetic Field Laboratories in conjunction with and located at two other sites Florida State University in Tallahassee, Florida, and University of Florida in Gainesville, Florida.

Los Alamos National Laboratory is a partner in the Joint Genome Institute (JGI) located in Walnut Creek, California. JGI was founded in 1997 to unite the expertise and resources in genome mapping, DNA sequencing, technology development, and information sciences pioneered at the three genome centers at University of California's Lawrence Berkeley National Laboratory (LBNL), Lawrence Livermore National Laboratory (LLNL), and LANL.

The Integrated Computing Network (ICN) is a multi-security level network at the LANL integrating large host supercomputers, a file server, a batch server, a printer and graphics output server and numerous other general purpose and specialized systems. IBM Roadrunner, which was part of this network, was the first supercomputer to hit petaflop speeds.

Until 1999, The Los Alamos National Laboratory hosted the arXiv e-print archive. The arXiv is currently operated and funded by Cornell University.

The coreboot project was initially developed at LANL.

In the recent years, the Laboratory has developed a major research program in systems biology modeling, known at LANL under the name q-bio.

Several serials are published by LANL:
 National Security Science
 1663
 Community Connections
 Actinide Research Quarterly
 @theBradbury
 Physical Sciences Vistas
LANL also published Los Alamos Science from 1980 to 2005, as well as the Nuclear Weapons Journal, which was replaced by National Security Science after two issues in 2009.

Controversy and criticism
In 2005, Congress held new hearings on lingering security issues at Los Alamos National Weapons Laboratory in New Mexico; documented problems continued to be ignored.

In November 2008 a drum containing nuclear waste was ruptured due to a 'deflagration' according to an inspector general report of the Dept. of Energy, which due to lab mistakes, also occurred in 2014 at the Carlsbad plant with significant disruptions and costs across the industry.

In 2009, 69 computers which did not contain classified information were lost. The same year also saw a scare in which 1 kg (2.2 lb) of missing plutonium prompted a Department of Energy investigation into the laboratory. The investigation found that the "missing plutonium" was a result of miscalculation by LANL's statisticians and did not actually exist; but the investigation did lead to heavy criticism of the laboratory by the DOE for security flaws and weaknesses that the DOE claimed to have found.

Institutional statistics
LANL is northern New Mexico's largest institution and the largest employer with approximately 8,762 direct employees, 277 guard force, 505 contractors, 1,613 students, 1,143 unionized craft workers, and 452 post-doctoral researchers.  Additionally, there are roughly 120 DOE employees stationed at the laboratory to provide federal oversight of LANL's work and operations. Approximately one-third of the laboratory's technical staff members are physicists, one-quarter are engineers, one-sixth are chemists and materials scientists, and the remainder work in mathematics and computational science, biology, geoscience, and other disciplines. Professional scientists and students also come to Los Alamos as visitors to participate in scientific projects. The staff collaborates with universities and industry in both basic and applied research to develop resources for the future. The annual budget is approximately US$2.2 billion.

Directors
 J. Robert Oppenheimer (1943–1945)
 Norris Bradbury (1945–1970)
 Harold Agnew (1970–1979)
 Donald Kerr (1979–1986)
 Siegfried S. Hecker (1986–1997)
 John C. Browne (1997–2003)
 George Peter Nanos (2003–2005)
 Robert W. Kuckuck (2005–2006)
 Michael R. Anastasio (2006–2011)
 Charles F. McMillan (2011–2017)
 Terry Wallace (2018)
 Thomas Mason (2018–present)

Notable scientists
Stirling Colgate (1925–2013)
Bette Korber
Emily Willbanks (1930–2007)
Mitchell Feigenbaum (1944–2019)
Richard Feynman (1918–1988)

In popular culture
In the hit TV show Breaking Bad, the protagonist Walter White is a former employee of the Los Alamos National Laboratory.

See also

 Anti-nuclear movement in the United States
 Association of Los Alamos Scientists
 Bradbury Science Museum
 Chalk River Laboratories
 Federation of American Scientists
 Clarence Max Fowler
 David Greenglass
 Ed Grothus
 Theodore Hall
 History of nuclear weapons
 Hydrogen-moderated self-regulating nuclear power module
 National Historic Landmarks in New Mexico
 National Register of Historic Places listings in Los Alamos County, New Mexico
 Julius and Ethel Rosenberg
 Timeline of Cox Report controversy
 Timeline of nuclear weapons development
 Venona Project

Notes

References

Further reading

External links

 
 Los AlamosOverview of Historical Operations
 Annotated bibliography on Los Alamos from the Alsos Digital Library
 University of California Office of Laboratory Management (official website)
 Los Alamos Neutron Science Center "LANSCE"
 Los Alamos Weather Machine
 LANL: The Real Story (LANL community blog)
 LANL: The Corporate Story (follow-up blog to "LANL: The Real Story)
 LANL: Technology Transfer, an example 
 LANL: The Rest of the Story (ongoing blog for LANL employees)
 Protecting the Nation's Nuclear Materials. Government Calls Arms Complexes Secure; Critics Disagree NPR.
 Los Alamos Study Groupan Albuquerque-based group opposed to nuclear weapons
 Site Y: Los Alamos A map of Manhattan Project Era Site Y: Los Alamos, New Mexico.
 Los Alamos National Laboratory Nuclear Facilities, 1997
 Machinists who assembled the atomic bomb.

 
Los Alamos, New Mexico
United States Department of Energy national laboratories
Buildings and structures in Los Alamos County, New Mexico
Federally Funded Research and Development Centers
Government buildings in New Mexico
Manhattan Project sites
Nuclear research institutes
Nuclear weapons infrastructure of the United States
Supercomputer sites
History of Los Alamos County, New Mexico
Government buildings on the National Register of Historic Places in New Mexico
Historic districts on the National Register of Historic Places in New Mexico
National Historic Landmarks in New Mexico
National Register of Historic Places in Los Alamos County, New Mexico
World War II on the National Register of Historic Places
Bechtel
University of California
Military research of the United States
Physics institutes
Theoretical physics institutes
1943 establishments in New Mexico
Research institutes in New Mexico